Jiangxi is a town of Xihe County in southeastern Gansu province, China. Its population is  29,031. , it has 30 villages under its administration:
Fenggou Village
Shanghu Village
Xiahu Village
Yangwan Village
Mayao Village
Zhaohe Village
Jiyao Village
Fengping Village
Xiezhuang Village
Qinggou Village
Dongpu Village
Dongpo Village
Jiangyao Village
Lishan Village
Fugou Village
Duanji Village
Jiaoshan Village
Shanping Village
Jiangchuan Village
Situ Village
Pengsi Village
Caogou Village
Xichuan Village
Zhangshan Village
Maping Village
Magou Village
Xifan Village
Maji Village
Beizhuangke Village
Xiwangji Village

References

Township-level divisions of Gansu
Xihe County